Trappenkamp is a municipality in the district of Segeberg, in Schleswig-Holstein, Germany. It is situated approximately 15 km east of Neumünster. It has about 5500 inhabitants.

References

Segeberg